Elyada Merioz (1932–2004) was an Israeli art collector and gallery owner.

Biography
Before the establishment of the state, Elyada Merioz was a member of the Irgun. In 1967, after the Six-Day War, Merioz was the first Jew to settle in the Old City of Jerusalem.

Immediately upon his arrival to the Jewish Quarter, Merioz worked on salvaging the remains of the synagogues bombed by the Jordanians during the war. The remains were displayed at a museum he established on Hayehudim Street #1. Among the most important remains were from the Hurva Synagogue.

Merioz later established the Blue and White Art Gallery, located in the old Roman Cardo in the middle of the Jewish Quarter. The gallery is now run by his son, Udi Merioz.

See also
 Visual arts in Israel

References

External links
 Jerusalem: Center of a sacred struggle but Jews, Arabs coexist in city claimed by both

1932 births
Jews in Mandatory Palestine
Israeli Jews
Israeli artists
2004 deaths
Irgun members
Contemporary art galleries in Israel
Israeli art dealers